Bumps Pond is a lake in Plymouth County, in the U.S. state of Massachusetts.

Bumps Pond was named after an early settler with the surname Bump or Bumpus.

References

Ponds of Plymouth, Massachusetts